Vijay Kumar Mishra, Indian politician
Vijay Mishra (politician), Indian politician
Vijay Mishra, academic from Fiji